In Monaco, the standard time is Central European Time (CET; UTC+01:00). Daylight saving time is observed from the last Sunday in March (02:00 CET) to the last Sunday in October (03:00 CEST). This is shared with several other EU member states.

History 
Monaco followed "Paris Mean Time" from 28 March 1911 until after World War II, when Monaco adopted CET.

IANA time zone database 
In the IANA time zone database, Monaco is given one zone in the file zone.tab – Europe/Monaco. Data for Monaco taken directly from zone.tab of the IANA time zone database; columns marked with * are the columns from zone.tab itself:

See also 
Time in Europe
List of time zones by country
List of time zones by UTC offset

References

External links 
Current time in Monaco at Time.is